Nigel Howe (born 7 April 1958) is a British property developer, and a director at Reading Football Club, who currently play in the SkyBet Championship in England.

The majority of Howe's career was in property management before joining John Madejski in 1995 when he took over as chief executive of Reading F.C.  Howe led the redevelopment of both the club's Madejski Stadium and its business management, and is also a non-executive director of a number of other businesses in which John Madejski has invested including the BenhamGoodhead Print Group, Sackville Properties and the Ark Group. He is also a non-executive director of the Clearview Traffic Group.

Howe is the nephew of former England and Arsenal coach Don Howe. His son Teddy Howe made his first appearance for Reading against Birmingham City on 5 May 2019.

Notes

Living people
1958 births
People from Reading, Berkshire
Chairmen of Reading F.C.
English chief executives
British sports executives and administrators